A trapiche is a mill made of wooden rollers used to extract juice from fruit, originally olives, and since the Middle Ages, sugar cane as well. By extension the word is also sometimes applied to the location of the mill, whether the workshop or the entire plantation.

Etymology 
The word has its origin in the Latin trapetum that means oil mill. From the Sicilian language trappitu the term, crossing the Mozarab Valencia, with its typical change of termination to «-ig» via the Catalan language (trapig -Gandía, 1536-, trapitz de canyamel -Mallorca, 1466-) has arrived to the other languages of the Iberian peninsula as trapiche. In the documents of the Duke of Gandía from the beginning of the fifteen century, one can see the term «trapig de canyamel», as a synecdoche to indicate the whole village engenho. According to Herrera: "..es de notar que antiguamente no auuia azucar,ſino en Valencia" ("note that in the old days there was no sugar except in Valencia").

Caribbean

Canarian precedents
In the late 15th century, the horizontal two-roller engenho or trapiche transferred seamlessly from the Portuguese in the Madeira Islands to the Canary Islands just as the Castilians (not yet known as Spanish), still struggled to control the Guanches, the rebellious indigenous Canarians. They were, in fact, the first coerced workers of the fledgling sugar industry on these islands. As the Iberians colonized the archipelagos off the coast of West Africa they relocated here most of the Mediterranean agricultural industry making of these islands the center of technological advancement in the Atlantic World. And in a matter of two decades after Christopher Columbus touched down on the Bahamas, just across the ocean, the trapiche followed European colonists to the Caribbean.  The first stop was the island of Hispaniola.

Hispaniola (Santo Domingo)
The trapiche's arrival to the Caribbean coincided with three crucial events in the early history of the Americas. They were the dramatic decline of the indigenous population, the arrival of the first enslaved Africans to the Americas and the sudden drop in the production of gold. While large numbers of colonists sought to escape the ensuing desolation and migrated to settle and desolate in turn other territories, those who stayed on Hispaniola turned to the sugar industry hustled at first by a mixture of enslaved indigenous people and Africans (ladinos and bozales).  In a few more years, as the indigenous population retrieved, enslaved Blacks made up the bulk if not all of the coerced workers.  With the promise of personal wealth implied in the system of slavery and with the advice of Canarian experts colonists began establishing some types of engenhos as early as 1514. According to Cronistas de Indias (Chroniclers of the Indies), Bartolomé de las Casas and Gonzalo Fernández de Oviedo y Valdés, it was Gonzales de Veloso (also, Gonzalez Veloso and Gonzalo de Vellosa) who built in what today is San Cristobal the first two-roller trapiche pulled by horses on Hispaniola. From there, it turned up on the Island of San Juan Bautista (Puerto Rico) and later in Cuba.

Three rollers
Though most current examples of trapiches in the Spanish Caribbean are of the three-rollers, according to scholar Anthony R. Stevens-Acevedo, the horizontal two-roller trapiche was the type used in the Caribbean throughout the end of the 16th century. As this piece of technology moved south to Tierra Firme (South America), the trapiche not only acquired a new roller, but it also erected all three of them to become a more efficient instrument of the expanding sugar industry. In this more elaborate shape, it soon returned to the Caribbean as the backbone of the sugar engenho.

South America

Sugar cane industry

Nowadays, the majority of the ingenios in Argentina or (engenhos in Brazil), use a trapiche to grind the sugarcane and extract its juice. They used water vapor as a driving force for mechanisms. In Latin America one can see small and transportable "street trapiches" handled by just one person. They can be installed almost anywhere to produce fresh cane juice. Its manufacture is artisanal, having even wooden gears.

Mining environment
In Argentina, Bolivia and Chile the term also applies to a type of mill used to reduce different kinds of minerals to dust. In the seventeenth century, these facilities and the raw material (ore, wages, the lease of the site and water, buildings ...) needed a considerable investment, the major part of it held by wealthy colonial elite.

Among the general mechanisms by which the Chilean economic life developed in the Colony, the trapiches were a highly profitable investment. On the other hand, the perception of metals as means of payment for its use, offered a source of profitability, as they were connected to the commercial circuit of gold but outside the margins of local production centers.

Outside South America this type of mill might be known as Chilean mill.

References

Bibliography
 Francisco Pons Moncho, Trapig: La producción de azucar en la Safor (siglos XIV-XVIII), Publicaciones del Instituto Duque Real Alonso el Viejo, Ajuntament de Gandia, 1979, 127 pàgines, 
 Fernando Nuez Viñals, La herencia árabe en la agricultura y el bienestar de occidente, València, Universitat Politècnica de València,  2002, 445 pàgines, 
 Miquel Barceló, El feudalisme comptat i debatut: Formació i expansió del feudalisme català, València, Universitat de València, 2003, 
 Sucre & Borja. La canyamel dels Ducs. Del trapig a la taula  Catàleg de l'Exposició, Gandia. Casa de la Cultura "Marqués de González de Quirós", 2000

External links 

Dukes of Gandía
Food processing
Grinding mills
History of sugar